Middleton Grange is a shopping centre in Hartlepool, England. It was built in 1969 and it was opened by Princess Anne on 27 May 1970. The site of the shopping centre was originally terraced streets that were demolished in the late 1960s.

History
The original architecture of the building is the 1960s brutalist style. It was originally an outdoor shopping centre but it was converted to an indoor shopping centre in 1992. It was built and owned by Hartlepool Borough Council until it was privatised in the 1990s. In 2011 it was announced that the bosses at Middleton Grange are planning a rebrand, a facelift and a major push to bring in more business with a £2 million investment which see the 1960s mosaic tile effect outside the shopping centre replaced and modernised, the sea blue colour scheme inside will be replaced with a battleship grey colour scheme, the signs will be replaced with new signs and BHS announced they will be opening a new two floor  department store with a cafe in the old Woolworths store in September 2011. There are a lot of empty units due to stores closing down in the 2007 recession as there is only an 80% occupancy rate of Middleton Grange, with the new BHS store opening this will increase the occupancy rate to 86%. The majority of the empty units are located in the East Mall, Upper West Mall and Market Walk areas. The longest serving retail outlet since the opening is Boots, following the closure of Woolworths in 2009 and the pending closure of Marks & Spencer in 2015. The four anchor tenants are Marks & Spencer (until 2015), BHS, Wilko and Primark, There was fifth anchor tenant, The Co-operative Home Store and it closed in October 2011 leaving the large unit empty, the Eugene's Cafe at the bottom of the unit stayed open but closed in September 2012. That particular unit and the Primark unit were previously a supermarket housing Fine Fare, then Gateway and finally Asda until they closed and moved to new premises on Hartlepool Marina in 1996. In 2012 Brighthouse, Home Bargains, JD Sports and Sports Direct moved to larger units and Carphone Warehouse and Gamestation closed. In 2014 Marks & Spencer announced they will be closing their store in Middleton Grange to open a Simply Food store in Anchor Retail Park at Hartlepool Marina. BHS closed their store in the centre when the company went into administration in 2016, all BHS branches throughout the UK were subsequently closed down.

Middleton Grange was originally built to replace the old town centre located around Lynn Street. Most of the shops and the market closed and moved to the shopping centre when it was completed. Most of Lynn Street was demolished in 1975 for construction of a new housing estate which some of Lynn Street still remains and is now called Lynn Street North.

Stores
As of May 2022, stores include Primark, Sports Direct,  Iceland, Boots  Poundland.

References

Buildings and structures in Hartlepool
Shopping centres in County Durham